Apothetoeca is a genus of moth in the family Gelechiidae. It contains the species Apothetoeca synaphrista, which is found on the Galapagos Islands.

References

Gelechiinae
Taxa named by Edward Meyrick
Monotypic moth genera
Moths of South America